Kyrylo Anatoliyovych Fesenko (born 24 December 1986) is a Ukrainian professional basketball player for Al-Nasr SC of the Libyan Division I Basketball League. He wears a size 18 shoe and has a  wingspan and  standing reach (same standing reach as Greg Oden).

Basketball career

Early career (2003–2006)
Born in Dnipropetrovsk, Fesenko began his basketball career in the Ukrainian Basketball SuperLeague, first with the second division team of BC Azovmash in 2003 then to its first division from 2004 to 2006. He then played for the Cherkaski Mavpy for a season.

First NBA stint (2007–2013)
After playing four seasons in native Ukraine, Fesenko was selected 38th overall in the second round of the 2007 NBA Draft by the Philadelphia 76ers and then traded to the Utah Jazz, signing a three-year contract with the Jazz on 15 August, 2007. In 2010, he turned down a multiyear deal with the Houston Rockets and re-signed with the Jazz for 1 year. He became an unrestricted free agent in 2011. He spent most of his rookie season with the NBA Development League Utah Flash.

On 30 November 2007, Fesenko made his NBA debut against the Los Angeles Lakers. He was recalled from the Utah Flash due to the absence of Carlos Boozer (sprained ankle) and Mehmet Okur (back spasms). Fesenko scored 6 points, had 7 rebounds and managed 1 assist.

Fesenko spent part of the 2011–12 NBA season with the Indiana Pacers. In October 2012, he joined the Chicago Bulls. Later that month he was waived.

Return to Europe (2013)
In January 2013, Fesenko signed with BC Donetsk. In November 2013, he signed with Śląsk Wrocław. He later left Wrocław before appearing in a game for them.

D-League / Return to NBA (2014)
In January 2014, Fesenko was acquired by the Delaware 87ers. On March 8, 2014, he was traded to the Canton Charge.

On 18 September 2014, Fesenko signed with the Minnesota Timberwolves. However, he was later waived by the Timberwolves on October 20, 2014.

Return to Europe (2014–2021)
On 5 November 2014, Fesenko signed with the VTB United League and EuroChallenge team Avtodor Saratov.

On 9 June 2015, Fesenko signed a one-year contract with Lokomotiv Kuban. On January 5, 2016, he parted ways with Lokomotiv, and the following day he was hired until the end of the season by Pallacanestro Cantù. On May 6, 2016, he left Cantù and signed with AS Monaco Basket for the rest of the 2015–16 LNB Pro A season.

On 16 August 2016, Fesenko signed with Italian club Sidigas Avellino for the 2016–17 season. On July 30, 2017, he re-signed with Avellino for one more season.

Iran (2021–present)
In October 2021, Fesenko signed with  Sanaye Hormozgan of the Iranian Basketball Super League.

NBA career statistics

Regular season

|-
| align="left" | 
| align="left" | Utah
| 9 || 0 || 7.8 || .375 || .000 || .500 || 2.8 || .2 || .0 || .3 || 1.6
|-
| align="left" | 
| align="left" | Utah
| 21 || 1 || 7.4 || .583 || .000 || .333 || 1.8 || .2 || .3 || .7 || 2.3
|-
| align="left" | 
| align="left" | Utah
| 49 || 5 || 8.3 || .547 || .000 || .421 || 1.8 || .3 || .1 || .4 || 2.6
|-
| align="left" | 
| align="left" | Utah
| 53 || 1 || 8.6 || .440 || .000 || .391 || 2.0 || .3 || .1 || .3 || 2.0
|-
| align="left" | 
| align="left" | Indiana
| 3 || 0 || 5.7 || .400 || .000 || .667 || 3.0 || .3 || .7 || .0 || 2.7
|-
| align="center" colspan="2"| Career 
| 135 || 7 || 8.2 || .496 || .000 || .410 || 2.0 || .3 || .1 || .4 || 2.3

Playoffs

|-
| align="left" | 2009–10
| align="left" | Utah
| 10 || 9 || 18.1 || .433 || .000 || .333 || 3.9 || 1.2 || .0 || .5 || 3.3

See also

List of European basketball players in the United States

References

External links

 Kyrylo Fesenko at fiba.com

1986 births
Living people
BC Avtodor Saratov players
BC Azovmash players
BC Cherkaski Mavpy players
BC Dnipro players
BC Donetsk players
Centers (basketball)
Delaware 87ers players
Expatriate basketball people in Monaco
Indiana Pacers players
Lega Basket Serie A players
National Basketball Association players from Ukraine
Pallacanestro Cantù players
PBC Lokomotiv-Kuban players
Philadelphia 76ers draft picks
S.S. Felice Scandone players
Sportspeople from Dnipro
Sanaye Hormozgan BC players
Ukrainian expatriate basketball people in the United States
Ukrainian expatriate basketball people in Russia
Ukrainian expatriate sportspeople in Italy
Ukrainian expatriate sportspeople in Monaco
Ukrainian men's basketball players
Utah Flash players
Utah Jazz players